Events in the year 1894 in Norway.

Incumbents
Monarch – Oscar II
Prime Minister –

Events
 The Norwegian Museum of Cultural History is founded. 
 The 1894 Parliamentary election takes place.

Arts and literature
Erika Nissen, pianist, is granted an artist's scholarship by the Norwegian state
The periodical For Kirke og Kultur is founded.

Notable births

1 January – Otto Aasen, Nordic skier (died 1983)
4 January – Hans Nikolai Stavrand, politician (died 1980)
7 January – Anton Beinset, journalist, newspaper editor, short story writer, crime fiction writer and politician (died 1963).
15 January – Jacob Opdahl, gymnast and Olympic gold medallist (died 1938)
1 March – Sigurd Maseng, diplomat (died 1952)
2 March – Halldis Stenhamar, journalist (died 1983).
4 March – Arne Rostad, politician (died 1969)
9 March – Jørgen Leonard Firing, politician (died 1977)
18 March – John Anker Johansen, gymnast and Olympic silver medallist (died 1986)
21 March – Hannah Ryggen, textile artist (died 1970).
31 March – Svein Rosseland, astrophysicist (died 1985)
2 April – Jørgen Bjørnstad, gymnast and Olympic silver medallist (died 1942)
13 April – Ludvig Irgens-Jensen, composer (died 1969)
5 May – Johan Sigurd Karlsen, politician (died 1967)
19 May  – Carl Søyland, Editor-in-chief of Nordisk Tidende (died 1978)
4 June – Alv Kjøs, politician (died 1990)
15 June – Trygve Gulbranssen, novelist (died 1962)
18 June – Ernst Ullring, naval officer (died 1953).
5 July – Eivind Holmsen, sport shooter (died 1990)
13 July – Aani Aanisson Rysstad, politician (died 1965)
25 July – Otto Johannessen, gymnast and Olympic silver medallist
20 August – Snefrid Eriksmoen, politician (died 1954)
8 September – Arne Damm, publisher and military officer (died 1968).
12 September – Endre Kristian Vestvik, politician (died 1956)
27 September – Johan Clementz, boxer (died 1952)
28 September – Thorleif Haug, skier and Olympic gold medallist (died 1934)
29 September – Ludvig Ellefsrød, politician (died 1983)
7 October – Ola Torstensen Lyngstad, politician (died 1952)
16 October – Ingvald Haugen, trade unionist and politician (died 1958)
30 October – Halvor Birkeland, sailor and Olympic gold medallist (died 1971)
5 November – Erling Wikborg, politician (died 1992)
12 November – Thorleif Schjelderup-Ebbe, zoologist
25 November – Håkon Ellingsen, rower and Olympic bronze medallist (died 1971)
11 December – Martin Linge, actor and military commander (died 1941)
26 December – Håkon Evjenth, jurist and children's writer (died 1951).

Full date unknown
Anders Beggerud, civil servant (died 1957)
Arne Dagfin Dahl, military officer (died 1990)
Mikkjel Fønhus, writer (died 1973)
Leif Grung, architect (died 1945)
Johan Peter Holtsmark, physicist (died 1975)
Olav Larssen, newspaper editor (died 1981)
Kristian Vilhelm Koren Schjelderup, Jr., Lutheran theologian, author and bishop (died 1980)
Carl Søyland, newspaper editor (died 1978)

Notable deaths

7 January – Søren Jaabæk, politician and farmer (born 1814)
29 March – Jacob Smith Jarmann, firearms designer (born 1816)
13 July – Daniel Cornelius Danielssen, physician (born 1815)
25 December – Julius Nicolai Jacobsen, businessperson and politician (born 1829)

Full date unknown
Hans J. C. Aall, politician (born 1806)
Svend Foyn, whaler (born 1809)
Niels Petersen Vogt, politician and Minister (born 1817)
Gisle Johnson, theologian (born 1822)

See also

References